William Ferguson (28 May 1938 – 31 October 1998) was a Northern Irish footballer who played as a winger.

Career
Born in Belfast, Ferguson played for Conlon Street Mission, Glentoran, Linfield and Ballymena United. He also earned two caps for the Northern Ireland national team.

References

1938 births
1998 deaths
Association footballers from Northern Ireland
Northern Ireland international footballers
Glentoran F.C. players
Linfield F.C. players
Ballymena United F.C. players
NIFL Premiership players
Association football wingers